Preakness (1867–1881) was an American Thoroughbred racehorse. He was sired by the famed leading sire Lexington out of a mare named Bay Leaf. Preakness was from Milton Holbrook Sanford's Preakness Stud in Preakness, Wayne Township, New Jersey.

Racing career
Preakness upset the heavily favored colt, Foster, to win the inaugural running of the Dixie Stakes (then known as the Dinner Party Stakes) on October 25, 1870, the opening day of Pimlico Race Course in Baltimore, Maryland. He continued his racing career until age 9 with a record of 18-12-2 in 39 starts.

Death
After his retirement from racing, Preakness was sold to stand at stud in England. He later became temperamental, as did his new owner, the Duke of Hamilton. After an altercation where Preakness refused to obey the Duke during a breeding session, he retrieved a gun and killed the colt, leading to a public outcry. As a result, there was a reform in the laws regarding the treatment of animals. Mr. Sanford, the previous owner of Preakness, donated his trophy from the Dinner Party Stakes to the new race named in honor of the horse.

Preakness Stakes
In honor of winning the first Dixie Stakes, a new stakes race was named in honor of Preakness: The Preakness Stakes.

In 2018, Preakness was inducted into the National Museum of Racing and Hall of Fame.

Pedigree

Sire line tree

Preakness
Fiddler
Jummy

References

1867 racehorse births
1881 racehorse deaths
Racehorses bred in Kentucky
Racehorses trained in the United States
Thoroughbred family 9
United States Thoroughbred Racing Hall of Fame inductees